The 2013 Trophée des Champions was the 18th edition of the French super cup. The match was contested by Paris Saint-Germain, the 2012–13 Ligue 1 champions and Bordeaux, the winners of the 2012–13 edition of the Coupe de France. The match was played at  the Stade d'Angondjé in Libreville, Gabon, the fifth consecutive time the competition had taken place on foreign soil. Paris Saint-Germain won the trophy after a 95th-minute headed winner from Alex. It was PSG's third win out of seven appearances in the fixture.

Match

Details

See also 
 2012–13 Ligue 1
 2012–13 Coupe de France

References

External links 
 Official site 

Trophee des champions
2013
Paris Saint-Germain F.C. matches
FC Girondins de Bordeaux matches
International club association football competitions hosted by Gabon
2013 in Gabonese sport
August 2013 sports events in Africa
Sports competitions in Libreville